Parika is a port village located in the Essequibo Islands-West Demerara region of Guyana. Its ferry service is operated by the Ministry of Transportation, to and from the Essequibo Islands and West Demerara area. It is a hub for land transport, since it is a route stop for local taxis commonly called "buses."

Overview
Parika is the end of the main road from Georgetown. In 2020, work started to upgrade the road from Demerara Harbour Bridge to Parika to a 2x2 lane dual carriageway.

Parika itself is a small town, however as a gateway to the western half of Guyana, it is always busy. It is best known for its market. Over 700 merchants own a stall on the market. Sunday is traditionally the busiest day of the week. Parika is home to a police station, post office, multiple hotels and a variety of restaurants.

Ferry services are offered to Bartica, Leguan Island, Wakenaam and Supenaam. The ferry to Bartica makes a stop at Fort Island. Cars need to be booked at least two hours in advance, and are not guaranteed a spot.

References

Populated places in Essequibo Islands-West Demerara